Joseph Peter McGlynn (born 27 September 2002) is a professional footballer who plays as a striker for National League North side Kidderminster Harriers, on loan from EFL Championship club Burnley. He was included in The Guardian's "Next Generation 2019". Born in England, he has represented Scotland at the under-18 level.

Early life 
McGlynn was born in Warrington, England. He joined the Clarets academy aged 12 in 2014.

Club career 
McGlynn came through the Burnley ranks, featuring in the under-18 and under-23 levels, scoring a combined 9 goals. McGlynn signed a senior contract with Burnley in June 2022. During 2020/21, he  struggled with injury. During 2021/22, he had suffered from  coronavirus, although he was on the bench for 2 of Burnley's last 3 premier league matches. He also has played for Burnley in the Lancashire Cup.

Oldham Athletic (loan) 
McGlynn was loaned for a month to National League club Oldham Athletic in September 2022. He made his first professional appearance against Woking, in a 3–0 loss away from home at Kingfield Stadium. His other league appearance came in a 3–0 loss to Bromley, also coincidently away from home.

Hyde United (loan) 
McGlynn was loaned again for a month to Northern Premier League club Hyde United in October 2022, where he scored his first senior goal against Bamber Bridge in a 7–0 thumping at Ewen Fields. He would score once more in his next match against Liversedge, away from home at Clayborn Ground, in a 3–1 win.

Kidderminster Harriers (loan) 
McGlynn was sent on loan to National League North side Kidderminster Harriers in January 2023, for the rest of the season. He has currently made 5 league appearances for the Harriers.

International career 
McGlynn played in a friendly for the Scotland under-18 team against Cameroon U18s, scoring in a 2–0 win, after being called up for Scotland youth national team training camps. McGlynn still has the option of playing for England though, as he was born there.

Style of play 

McGlynn is known for his knack of goalscoring, having scored at the U15/16, U18, and U23 levels of Burnley youth teams.

See also 

 List of English football transfers winter 2022–23

External links 

 Joe McGlynn at Scottish FA
 Joe McGlynn at Soccerway
 Joe McGlynn at World Football

References 

Scottish football biography stubs
Scottish footballers
English footballers
English people of Scottish descent
Burnley F.C. players
Oldham Athletic A.F.C. players
Kidderminster Harriers F.C. players
Hyde United F.C. players
National League (English football) players
Scotland youth international footballers
Association football forwards
Association football forward stubs
Footballers from Warrington
2002 births
Living people
Northern Premier League players